Valtina is a village in Valga Parish, Valga County, in southeastern Estonia. It has a population of 33 (as of 1 January 2004).

The currently inactive Valga–Pechory railway passes Valtina on its northern side, there's a station named "Tuulemäe".

References

Villages in Valga County